Giuseppe Tonani (2 October 1890 – 1 October 1971) was an Italian heavyweight weightlifter who won a gold medal at the 1924 Olympics, placing seventh in 1928. Earlier in 1920 he was part of the Italian Olympics tug of war team.

References

1890 births
1971 deaths
Italian male weightlifters
Tug of war competitors at the 1920 Summer Olympics
Weightlifters at the 1924 Summer Olympics
Weightlifters at the 1928 Summer Olympics
Olympic tug of war competitors of Italy
Olympic weightlifters of Italy
Olympic gold medalists for Italy
Olympic medalists in weightlifting
Medalists at the 1924 Summer Olympics
19th-century Italian people
20th-century Italian people